In set theory, an extender is a system of ultrafilters which represents an elementary embedding witnessing large cardinal properties. A nonprincipal ultrafilter is the most basic case of an extender.

A (κ, λ)-extender can be defined as an elementary embedding of some model  of ZFC− (ZFC minus the power set axiom) having critical point κ ε M, and which maps κ to an ordinal at least equal to λ. It can also be defined as a collection of ultrafilters, one for each -tuple drawn from λ.

Formal definition of an extender

Let κ and λ be cardinals with κ≤λ. Then, a set  is called a (κ,λ)-extender if the following properties are satisfied:
 each  is a κ-complete nonprincipal ultrafilter on [κ]<ω and furthermore
 at least one  is not κ+-complete,
 for each  at least one  contains the set 
 (Coherence) The  are coherent (so that the ultrapowers Ult(V,Ea) form a directed system).
 (Normality) If  is such that  then for some 
 (Wellfoundedness) The limit ultrapower Ult(V,E) is wellfounded (where Ult(V,E) is the direct limit of the ultrapowers Ult(V,Ea)).

Then  and  cohere if

Defining an extender from an elementary embedding

Given an elementary embedding  which maps the set-theoretic universe  into a transitive inner model  with critical point κ, and a cardinal λ, κ≤λ≤j(κ),  one defines  as follows:

One can then show that  has all the properties stated above in the definition and therefore is a (κ,λ)-extender.

References

 
 

Inner model theory
Mathematical logic
Model theory
Large cardinals
Set theory